Haukur Sigurðsson can refer to:

 Haukur Sigurðsson (alpine skier) (born 1930), Icelandic alpine skier
 Haukur Sigurðsson (cross-country skier) (born 1956), Icelandic cross-country skier
 Haukur Páll Sigurðsson (born 1987), Icelandic footballer